Multidrug resistance-associated protein 7 is a protein that in humans is encoded by the ABCC10 gene.

The protein encoded by this gene is a member of the superfamily of ATP-binding cassette (ABC) transporters. ABC proteins transport various molecules across extra- and intra-cellular membranes. ABC genes are divided into seven distinct subfamilies (ABC1, MDR/TAP, MRP, ALD, OABP, GCN20, and White). This ABC full-transporter is a member of the MRP subfamily which is involved in multi-drug resistance. Alternative splicing of this gene results in multiple transcript variants; however, not all variants have been fully described.

See also
 ATP-binding cassette transporter

References

Further reading

External links 
 
 

ATP-binding cassette transporters